Saeb Jendeya (born May 13, 1975 in Gaza, Gaza Strip) is a former Palestinian footballer and coach.

He played as a defender. He has amassed 70 caps since Palestine's induction into FIFA in 1998. He is the former captain of the Palestinian national team and served as captain from 1999 to his retirement from international football in 2009, making him one of the most tenured captains in international football in terms of years served. Jendeya has scored one goal with the national team- a midfield shot against Libya in injury-time that leveled the score at 2-2 in the 1999 Pan-Arab Games. This goal allowed Palestine to advance to the knock-out stages where they eventually finished 3rd.

He captained Palestine's beach soccer team to a third-place finish at the 2012 Asian Beach Games.

On 11 September 2014, Jendeya was named interim manager of Palestine national football team to replace with Jamal Mahmoud. However, before the 2015 AFC Asian Cup, he was sacked.

Palestine results

International goals

External links
Koora.com

References

1975 births
Living people
Palestinian footballers
Palestinian football managers
Palestine national football team managers
People from Gaza City
Palestine international footballers
Footballers at the 2002 Asian Games

Association football defenders
Asian Games competitors for Palestine